Knight Games is a 1986 video game published by Mastertronic.

Gameplay
Knight Games is a game in which Medieval duels are conducted using weapons such as swords, battle axes, quarterstaves, and maces.

Reception
David M. Wilson reviewed the game for Computer Gaming World, and stated that "Knight Games is proof positive that budgetware doesn't have to be garbageware."

Reviews
ASM (Aktueller Software Markt) - Aug, 1986
Zzap! - Sep, 1986
Amstrad Action - Sep, 1986
Computer Gamer - Jul, 1986
Computer and Video Games - Oct, 1989
The Games Machine - May, 1989

References

External links
Review in I Magnifici Sette (Italian)
Review in Your Computer
Review in Micromania Primer Epoca (Spanish)
Review in Amtix
Review in Commodore User
Review in Computer and Video Games

1986 video games
Action video games
Amstrad CPC games
Commodore 64 games
DOS games
Fictional knights in video games
Mastertronic games
Sports video games
Video games developed in the United Kingdom
Video games set in medieval England